The Diocese of Tirunelveli is one among the 24 dioceses of the Church of South India (CSI).It is based at Tirunelveli, in the state of Tamil Nadu, southern India. The diocese has 687 churches, 101 pastors, and a membership of 1,86,000.Holy Trinity Cathedral, at Palayamkottai is the Cathedral of Tirunelveli Diocese. The churches were established by church missionary society (CMS) missionaries and Society for propagating gospel (SPG) missionaries. In the year of 1919 Tinnevely Diocese Trust Association (TDTA)was formed by uniting both mission and also with baptists and presbyterians churches in the neighbourhood.

History
V. S. Azariah, the first Indian bishop, came from Tirunelveli Diocese

Issues in 2015
In November 2015, the Tirunelveli diocese increased the annual membership amount (in Tamil : Kanikkai) from Rs 100 to Rs 500. The retirement age of the pastors also increased by the CSI synod from 65 to 67, and correction was made in the rule to permit pastors to remove someone from the diocese. Against all these decisions, members raised their voices. They requested to take a vote to implement these changes, but the Bishop ignored them and said that these changes are acceptable without proper voting. The members have thrown chairs to display their opposition. Due to the decision to increase the retirement age, J J Christdoss's retirement age also increased.

Issues in 2014
In 2014, one school teacher committed suicide as she was transferred. The diocese management was blamed for this.

2008 Issues
In 2008, the then administration led by a bus company owner rigged the election and but were eventually defeated in the election.

Bishops of the Diocese
 Samuel Morley (1896–1903)
 Arthur Williams (1905–1914)
 Edward Waller (1915–1923)
 Norman Tubbs (1923–1928)
 Frederick Western (1923–1928)
 Stephen Neill (1939–1944)
 George Selwyn (1945–1952)
 Augustine Jebaraj	(1953–1970)
 Thomas Garrett (1971–1974)	
 Daniel Abraham (1975–1984)	
 Jason Dharmaraj (1985–1999)
 Jeyapaul David	(1999–2009)
 JJ Christdoss 2009-2020)
 ARGST Barnabas 2021 -

Educational Institutions under the Diocese

Primary and Middle Schools -323
Higher Secondary Schools-13
Colleges -6
Teacher Training Institutes -3

See also
 Church of South India
 Thoothukudi-Nazareth Diocese
 Madurai-Ramnad Diocese
 Diocese of Madras
 Trichy-Tanjore Diocese
 Diocese of Coimbatore
 Diocese of Kanyakumari
 Christianity in Tamil Nadu
 Church of North India
 Christianity in India

References

External links 
 CSI Tirunelveli Diocese

Tirunelveli
Christianity in Tamil Nadu
Tirunelveli
Tirunelveli district